Strajk Kobiet (Polish for "Women's Strike) may refer to:
October–November 2020 Polish protests
All-Poland Women's Strike